Tragic Kingdom is the third studio album by American rock band No Doubt, released on October 10, 1995, by Trauma Records and Interscope Records. It was the final album to feature original keyboardist Eric Stefani, who left the band in 1994. The album was produced by Matthew Wilder and recorded in 11 studios in the Greater Los Angeles area between March 1993 and October 1995. Between 1995 and 1998, seven singles were released from it, including "Just a Girl", which charted on the Billboard Hot 100 and the UK Singles Chart; and "Don't Speak", which topped the Billboard Hot 100 Airplay and reached the top five of many international charts.

The album received mostly positive reviews from music critics and became the band's most commercially successful album, reaching number one on the Billboard 200 as well as topping the charts in Canada and New Zealand. At the 39th Annual Grammy Awards, No Doubt earned nominations for Best New Artist and Best Rock Album. It has sold over 16 million copies worldwide, and was certified diamond by the Recording Industry Association of America (RIAA) in the United States and Canada, platinum in the United Kingdom, and triple platinum in Australia. Tragic Kingdom helped to initiate the ska revival of the 1990s, persuading record labels to sign more ska bands and helping them to attract more mainstream attention. The album was ranked number 441 on Rolling Stone magazine's list of the 500 greatest albums of all time.

No Doubt embarked on a tour to promote the album. It was designed by Project X and lasted two and a half years. An early 1997 performance at the Arrowhead Pond of Anaheim was filmed and released as Live in the Tragic Kingdom on VHS and later DVD.

Background
No Doubt released their self-titled debut album in 1992, a year after being signed to Interscope. The album's pop-oriented sound sharply contrasted with grunge music, a genre which was very popular at the time in the United States. The album sold 30,000 copies; in the words of the program director of KROQ, a Los Angeles radio station on which it was one of the band's driving ambitions to be played, "it would take an act of God for this band to get on the radio." The band began work on their second album in 1993, but Interscope rejected most of the material, and paired the band with producer Matthew Wilder. Keyboardist Eric Stefani did not want to relinquish creative control to someone outside the band and eventually stopped recording and rehearsing. He encouraged other members of the band to write songs, but sometimes felt threatened when they did. Eric became increasingly depressed, and in September 1994, he stopped attending rehearsals, though they were usually held at his house. He soon left the band to pursue an animation career on the animated sitcom The Simpsons. Bassist Tony Kanal then ended his seven-year relationship with Gwen Stefani.

The band decided to produce their next album independently and recorded their second album, The Beacon Street Collection, in a homemade studio. No Doubt's first two singles were released for The Beacon Street Collection: "Squeal" and "Doghouse", under their own record label, Beacon Street Records. Despite limited availability, the album sold 100,000 copies in the year of its release. Their independence attracted Interscope's attention and ensured that the label would fund a third album.

Production

Tragic Kingdom was recorded in 11 studios in Los Angeles, starting in March 1993 and released in October 1995. During one of these recording sessions, the band was introduced to Paul Palmer, who had previously worked with Bush and was interested in working on No Doubt's new album. After mixing the first single with David J. Holman, "Just a Girl", Palmer and Holman went on to do the same to the rest of the record. He wanted to release the album on his own label, Trauma Records, which was already associated with Interscope, and succeeded in getting the contract.

The album is named after the nickname Dumont's seventh-grade teacher had for Disneyland, which is in Anaheim, California, where the band members grew up. The album photography and portraits were taken by photographer fine artist Daniel Arsenault. Gwen is featured in the foreground while the rest of the band members are standing in an orange grove in the background. Gwen pushed for Eric to be included on the album cover—a source of tension for the band—reasoning that although he had left the band, he had still contributed substantially to the album. Eric is seen near the back of the picture, looking away from the camera. The pictures on the cover and in the liner notes were taken on city streets in their native Orange County (namely Anaheim and City of Orange) and in orange groves. The red dress Gwen wears on the cover was loaned to the Hard Rock Cafe and was later displayed at the Fullerton Museum Center in an exhibit titled "The Orange Groove: Orange County's Rock n' Roll History". The dress, appraised as high as US$5,000, was stolen from the exhibit in January 2005.

Music and lyrics
Tragic Kingdom uses elements of a variety of musical genres. Ska, ska punk, pop and rock are the genres most prominent on the album. The album also uses elements of punk, new wave, funk, third-wave ska and post-grunge, and dance rhythms influenced by reggae, ska, flamenco, and Tejano, among others. Apart from No Doubt's instrumentation, the album uses horn sections on several songs.

Many of the lyrics on Tragic Kingdom were written by lead vocalist Gwen Stefani, and were about her experiences in life. Those from No Doubt and The Beacon Street Collection were written mainly by Eric Stefani, who left the band after Tragic Kingdom was finished. Therefore, the style of music changed from what the band had previously produced. Guitarist Tom Dumont explained the change in sound in an interview for Backstage Online:

Singles
The first single released from Tragic Kingdom was "Just a Girl", which details Gwen Stefani's exasperation with female stereotypes and her father's concerned reaction to her driving home late from her boyfriend's house. It peaked at number 23 on the Billboard Hot 100 chart and number 10 on the Modern Rock Tracks chart. The song also charted on the UK Singles Chart, where its original release peaked at number 38 and its reissue at number three. The second single was "Spiderwebs", written about an uninterested woman who is trying to avoid the constant phone calls of a persistent man. It reached number five on the Billboard Modern Rock Tracks chart, number 11 on the Billboard Top 40 Mainstream chart, and number 16 on the UK Singles Chart.

The third single was "Don't Speak", a ballad about the breakup of Stefani and Kanal's relationship. It peaked at number one on the Billboard Hot 100 Airplay, and maintained that position for 16 consecutive weeks, a record at the time, although it was broken in 1998 by the Goo Goo Dolls' "Iris" with 18 weeks. The song was not eligible to chart on the Billboard Hot 100 because no commercial single was released, which was a requirement at the time. The song also peaked at number two on the Modern Rock Tracks chart, at number six on the Adult Contemporary chart, at number one on the Adult Top 40 chart, and at number nine on the Rhythmic Top 40 chart. The song also appeared on several international charts, reaching number one in Australia, Belgium, the Netherlands, New Zealand, Norway, Sweden, Switzerland, and the United Kingdom, number two in Austria and Germany, and number four in Finland and France.

"Excuse Me Mr." and "Sunday Morning" were released as the album's fourth and fifth singles, respectively. "Excuse Me Mr." reached number 17 on the Billboard Modern Rock Tracks chart and number 11 in New Zealand. "Sunday Morning" peaked at number 35 on the Billboard Top 40 Mainstream chart, number 21 in Australia, number 42 in New Zealand, and number 55 in Sweden. Composing the song began when Kanal was having a fight with Stefani, then his girlfriend, through the bathroom door of his parents' house in Yorba Linda, California. Stefani later changed the lyrics to discuss dealing with her breakup with Kanal. "Happy Now?" was released as the album's sixth single on September 23, 1997, but failed to chart anywhere. "Hey You!" was released as the seventh and final single from Tragic Kingdom; it peaked at number 51 on the Dutch Single Top 100. Despite being a Dutch-only single, a Sophie Muller-directed music video was filmed to promote the single.

Release and promotion
Tragic Kingdom was first released by Trauma and Interscope on October 10, 1995. To promote the album, Trauma launched a street campaign that targeted high school students and the skateboarding community. No Doubt performed on the Warped Tour, which was sponsored by several skateboarding companies, and at several skateboarding festivals. The album remained low on the Billboard 200 and did not enter the top 100 until February 1996, when it jumped 27 positions to number 89. Palmer attributed the jump to a Channel One News program that Stefani hosted in January 1996, which was broadcast in 12,000 classrooms, and the band's subsequent performance at a Blockbuster store in Fresno, California.

In May 1996, the band worked with HMV, MuchMusic, and the Universal Music Group to put on a global in-store promotion. The band performed and answered questions in MuchMusic's studios in Toronto, Ontario. The session was broadcast live to HMV stores worldwide and on a webcast so that fans could watch and ask the band questions through MuchMusic's VJs. Sales of Tragic Kingdom doubled the week after the event. The event's sponsors lobbied Guinness World Records to create a category for the largest virtual in-store promotion to recognize the event.

No Doubt embarked on the Tragic Kingdom Tour after the release of the album. It chose Project X, headed by Luc Lafortune and Michael Keeling, to design the stage. No Doubt suggested decorating the stage as a clearing in a forest. Project X created three anthropomorphic trees with glowing oranges. The show included clear and mylar confetti designed to look like rain. Lighting design was difficult because there were only four rehearsals, so the show was arranged to be flexible to allow for what Lafortune referred to as "a very kinetic performance". The band expected to tour for two months, but the tour ended up lasting two and a half years.

An early 1997 performance at the Arrowhead Pond of Anaheim was filmed and was released as Live in the Tragic Kingdom on VHS on November 11, 1997. It was re-released on November 25, 2003, on DVD as part of the box set Boom Box, which also contained The Singles 1992–2003, Everything in Time, and The Videos 1992–2003; and again on June 13, 2006, as a stand-alone DVD, containing bonus material of extra songs, a photo gallery, and an alternative version of "Don't Speak".

Critical reception

The album received mostly positive reviews from critics. David Fricke of Rolling Stone magazine gave a mostly positive review, describing Tragic Kingdom as "ear candy with good beats, not just bludgeon-by-numbers guitars" and its music as "a spry, white-suburban take on ska and Blondieesque pop". Fricke however described "Don't Speak" as "irritating swill" with "high-pitched rippling" from Gwen Stefani. In 2003, the album was ranked number 441 on Rolling Stone magazine's list of the 500 greatest albums of all time. Entertainment Weeklys David Browne attributed the album's sales to Gwen Stefani's "leggy, bleached-blond calling card" and concluded that "sex still sells". Browne, however, described the music as "a hefty chunk of new-wave party bounce and Chili Peppers-style white-boy funk, with dashes of reggae, squealing hair-metal guitar, disco, ska-band horns" and the band as sounding like "savvy, lounge-bred pros". Individual songs were singled out and commented on: "Just a Girl" was described as "a chirpy, ska-tinged bopper", "Don't Speak" as "an old-fangled power ballad", "Sixteen" as a "song of solidarity with misunderstood teenage girls", and "Spiderwebs" and "End It on This" as "[Stefani] acknowledg[ing] obsessions with losers and tr[ying] to break free."

Calling the album a marked improvement over "the diffuse, rambling songwriting of [No Doubt's] two previous CDs", Mike Boehm of the Los Angeles Times felt that on the album, "The band is bright, hard-hitting and kinetic, as sharp production captures the core, four-man instrumental team and adjunct horn section at their best". In a favorable review for The Village Voice, critic Chuck Eddy felt that although "[the album] turns pretentious ... No Doubt resurrects the exuberance new-wave guys lost when '80s indie labels and college radio conned them into settling for slam-pit fits and wallflower wallpaper". AllMusic called it "pure fun" and described the music as something "between '90s punk, third-wave ska, and pop sensibility" and a mix of "new wave melodicism, post-grunge rock, and West Coast sunshine", indicating the songs "Spiderwebs", "Just a Girl", and "Don't Speak" as "positively [ruling] the airwaves". Yahoo! Music reviewer Bill Holdship called the album a "phenomenon" containing "hit after hit", and describing "Spiderwebs" as "a terrific opener". Reviewer Robert Christgau called Stefani "hebephrenic" and the album "hyped up" and not "as songful as its fun-besotted partisans [claim]". At the 1997 Grammy Awards, No Doubt were nominated for Best New Artist and Best Rock Album.

In 2000, it was voted number 436 in Colin Larkin's All Time Top 1000 Albums.

Commercial performance
After entering the Billboard 200 at number 175 in January 1996, Tragic Kingdom eventually reached number one in December 1996, with 229,000 copies sold, spending nine non-consecutive weeks atop the chart. It was listed second on the 1997 Billboard 200 year-end chart, behind the Spice Girls' Spice. On February 5, 1999, the Recording Industry Association of America (RIAA) certified the album diamond, and as of July 2012, it had sold 8,167,000 copies in the United States; it sold an additional 1.32 million copies through BMG Music Club. Tragic Kingdom topped the Canadian Albums Chart in December 1996, and it was certified diamond by the Canadian Recording Industry Association (CRIA) in August 1997. In Europe, the album topped the chart in Belgium, Finland, and Norway, while reaching the top five in Austria, Germany, the Netherlands, Sweden, Switzerland, and the United Kingdom, and the top 20 in France. By April 2004, the album had sold 16 million copies worldwide.

The commercial success of Tragic Kingdom prompted record labels to sign ska bands, and more independent labels released ska records and compilations. Save Ferris's guitarist and vocalist Brian Mashburn stated that No Doubt helped allow bands like his receive attention from the mainstream.

Track listing
All tracks produced by Matthew Wilder.

Personnel
Credits adapted from the liner notes of Tragic Kingdom.

No Doubt
 Gwen Stefani – vocals
 Tom Dumont – guitar
 Tony Kanal – bass
 Adrian Young – drums, percussion
 Eric Stefani – piano, keyboards

Additional musicians

 Phil Jordan – trumpet and flugelhorn
 Gabrial McNair – trombone, additional percussion
 Gerard Boisse – saxophone 
 Stephen Perkins – steel drum 
 Aloke Dasgupta – sitar 
 Melissa Hasin – cello 
 Bill Bergman – saxophone 
 Les Lovitt – trumpet 
 Greg Smith – baritone saxophone 
 Nick Lane – trombone 
 Matthew Wilder – additional keyboards 
 Albhy Galuten – director of paradigm

Technical

 Matthew Wilder – production
 Phil Kaffel – recording 
 George Landress – recording 
 Matt Hyde – recording 
 John "Tokes" Potoker – recording 
 Ray Blair – recording 
 David J. Holman – mixing at Cactus Studios (Hollywood)
 Paul Palmer – mixing at Cactus Studios (Hollywood)
 Robert Vosgien – mastering at CMS Digital (Pasadena)

Artwork
 Morbido / Bizarrio – creative direction, design, digital imaging
 Dan Arsenault – photography
 Shelly Robertson – photography
 Patrick Miller – photography

Charts

Weekly charts

Year-end charts

Decade-end charts

All-time charts

Certifications and sales

See also
 List of best-selling albums in the United States
 List of Billboard 200 number-one albums of 1996
 List of Billboard 200 number-one albums of 1997
 List of number-one albums of 1996 (Canada)
 List of number-one albums of 1997 (Canada)

Notes

References

1995 albums
Albums produced by Matthew Wilder
Interscope Records albums
No Doubt albums